The women's 60 metres hurdles event at the 2011 European Athletics Indoor Championships was held on 4 March with the final being held 18:40 local time.

Records

Results

Heats
First 3 in each heat and 4 best performers advanced to the Semifinals. The heats were held at 09:20.

Semifinals 
First 4 in each heat advanced to the Final. The semifinals were held at 15:45.

Final 
The final was held at 18:40.

References 

60 metres hurdles at the European Athletics Indoor Championships
2011 European Athletics Indoor Championships
2011 in women's athletics